Erumuse Momoh (born January 14, 1997) is an American soccer player who plays as a defender.

Career

College and amateur
Momoh played four years of college soccer at the University of Pennsylvania between 2016 and 2019, making 60 appearances, scoring two goals and tallying three assists.

Momoh appeared for clubs in the USL PDL whilst at college, with Baltimore Bohemians in 2016, and Seacoast United Phantoms in 2017.

In his senior year and following college, Momoh played with NPSL side FC Baltimore. He made eight appearances for the team in 2018 and a further two in 2019.

Professional
On March 4, 2020, Momoh signed with USL Championship side Loudoun United. He made his debut for the club on August 19, 2020, appearing as a 67th-minute substitute during a 2–0 loss to Pittsburgh Riverhounds.

Personal life
Momoh is of Nigerian descent.

References

External links
Erumuse Momoh - Men's Soccer at Penn Quakers
Erumuse Momoh | uslchampionship.com at USL Championship

1997 births
Living people
American soccer players
Association football defenders
Penn Quakers men's soccer players
Baltimore Bohemians players
Seacoast United Phantoms players
Loudoun United FC players
Soccer players from Maryland
USL League Two players
National Premier Soccer League players
USL Championship players